The IMOCA 60 Class yacht PRB 5 was designed by Verdier Design Team headed by Guillaume Verdier and is due to be launched in 2022, after being built by Carrington Boats in Hythe, England. The boat was shipped to France for final fitout. The hull was moulded for an Ocean Race project that was cancelled during the COVID-19 pandemic. The PRB team used the part completed as a way to accelerate their build process and get back out on the water following the sinking of PRB 4.

References 

2020s sailing yachts
Sailboat type designs by Guillaume Verdier
Vendée Globe boats
IMOCA 60
Sailboat types built in the United Kingdom